Dave Worthy (15 September 1934 – 27 December 2004) was a member of the House of Commons of Canada from 1988 to 1993. He was born in Consul, Saskatchewan and had a varied career including teaching, computer engineering, hotel management and general business.

He was elected in the 1988 federal election at the Cariboo—Chilcotin electoral district for the Progressive Conservative party. He served in the 34th Canadian Parliament but lost to Philip Mayfield of the Reform Party in the 1993 federal election.

External links
 

1934 births
2004 deaths
Members of the House of Commons of Canada from British Columbia
Progressive Conservative Party of Canada MPs
Canadian Baptists
People from Rural Municipality Reno No. 51, Saskatchewan
20th-century Baptists